James Dalton may refer to:

 James Dalton (criminal) (died 1730), captain of a street robbery gang in 18th-century London, England
 James Dalton (footballer) (1864–?), Irish footballer
 James Dalton (MP for Saltash) (died 1601), MP for Saltash, Lostwithiel and Preston
 James Dalton (pastoralist) (1834–1919), pastoralist in Australia
 James Dalton (rugby union) (born 1972), South African rugby player
 James Dalton II (1910–1945), United States Army general killed in the Philippines during World War II
 James E. Dalton (born 1930), retired United States Air Force general, Director of the Joint Staff
 J. J. Dalton (James Joseph Dalton, 1861–1924), Irish nationalist Member of Parliament
 James Langley Dalton (1833–1887), English soldier
 James T. Dalton (born 1963), American pharmacist
 James Dalton Highway, Alaska

Characters
 James Dalton, portrayed by Patrick Swayze in the 1989 film Road House
 James Dalton, a fictional character in the Australian soap opera Home and Away played by Gyton Grantley